Bohemian National Hall (Czech: Česká národní budova) is a five-story building at 321 East 73d Street on the Upper East Side, Manhattan. The building was built between 1895 and 1897 in neo-Renaissance style by architect William C. Frohne. It was a Czech American social and culture center in New York City.  From the late 1930s to the 1980s it was rented out to various organizations, including the Manhattan Theater Club, which began there. In 1994 the New York City Landmarks Preservation Commission named it a landmark.

In 2001, it was sold by the Bohemian Benevolent & Literary Association to the Czech government for $1.  In return, the Czech government agreed to renovate the building.  Its first use after the change of ownership came in 2005, when it served as the venue for a celebration of the 70th birthday of Václav Havel, a kickoff event for Untitled Theater Company #61's Havel Festival. After a few more events, the Hall shut down for further renovation, reopening October 30, 2008.

Now the building is the seat of the Czech Consulate, the New York Czech Center, the Bohemian Benevolent & Literary Association and the Dvorak American Heritage Association. In the building is also a small cinema, an art gallery, a major ballroom/theater and a roof terrace. Since May 23, 2011 a Czech restaurant called Hospoda is located on the ground floor of the building.

See also 
 National Register of Historic Places listings in Manhattan below 14th Street
 List of New York City Designated Landmarks in Manhattan below 14th Street

External links 

 Bohemian National Hall official site
 Bohemian Benevolent and Literary Association
 Consulate General of the Czech Republic in New York official site
 Czech Center official site
 Bohemian National Hall in The New York Times
 Hospoda – a Czech restaurant located in Bohemian National Hall

References 

1897 establishments in New York City
Cultural infrastructure completed in 1897
Clubhouses in Manhattan
Czech-American culture in New York City
New York City Designated Landmarks in Manhattan
Renaissance Revival architecture in New York City